Rob Biddulph is a British children's author and illustrator.

Early life 
Biddulph was born on 12 October 1972 in Barnet, London. He attended Dame Alice Owen's School. He graduated with a BA(Hons) degree in Visual Communication and Design from Middlesex University in 1994

Career 
Before becoming an author and illustrator, he worked as an art director for The Observer Magazine, NME, Uncut, SKY Magazine and Just Seventeen.

In 2014, he published his first picture book, Blown Away, about an intrepid blue penguin. In 2015, he won the Waterstones Children's Book Prize for Blown Away. It was only the second picture book in history to win the prize.

Several of his picture books have featured on the BBC television series CBeebies Bedtime Stories. Odd Dog Out was read by Tom Hardy in 2017, Blown Away was read by Mark Bonnar in 2017, GRRRRR! was read by Chris Kamara in 2019, Show and Tell was read by Rick Astley in 2019, and An Odd Dog Christmas was read by Tom Hardy in 2021.

In 2021, he published his first middle-grade book, Peanut Jones and the Illustrated City, to critical acclaim.

Biddulph was the official World Book Day illustrator between 2019 and 2021.

Draw With Rob 
In March 2020, Biddulph started the #DrawWithRob initiative. He began to upload a series of free, twice-weekly draw-along videos to help children looking for things to keep them occupied whilst stuck at home during the COVID-19 pandemic. It was an immediate hit, receiving millions of views worldwide, and became an important part of many children's lockdown experience. On 20 May 2020, Biddulph broke the Guinness World Record for the largest ever online art class when 45,611 households joined him in drawing a blue whale via his YouTube channel. In the process, over £50,000 was raised for charity. In recognition of the service he provided for thousands of children, he was named as a UK Point of Light by Boris Johnson, the British Prime Minister, in 2020, who said “As our country observed the toughest restrictions in living memory, you inspired the creative spirit of the nation with millions of families tuning in to your #DrawWithRob series and spending special time together honing their artistic skills."

All of the #DrawWithRob videos are available to watch for free.

Publications
Blown Away, 2014
GRRRRR!, 2015
Odd Dog Out, 2016
Sunk!, 2017
Kevin, 2017
Dinosaur Juniors: Happy Hatchday, 2018
Dinosaur Juniors: Give Peas a Chance, 2018
Dinosaur Juniors: Wide Awake, 2019
Show and Tell, 2019
Dog Gone, 2020
An Odd Dog Christmas, 2021
The Blue-footed Booby, 2022
Peanut Jones and the Illustrated City, 2021
Peanut Jones and the Twelve Portals, 2022
The Draw With Rob series, 2020-2027
The Flat Stanley series, 2017-2018, written by Jeff Brown
The Radio Boy series, 2017-2018, written by Christian O'Connell
The Adventures of Parsley the Lion, 2020, written by Michael Bond
The Super Miraculous Journey of Freddie Yates, 2020, written by Jenny Pearson
The Furry Purry Beancat series, 2020, written by Philip Ardagh

Awards and recognitions 

 2015: Waterstones Children's Book Prize, winner (Blown Away)
 2015: Waterstones Children's Book Prize, Best Illustrated Book, winner (Blown Away)
 2015: Kate Greenaway Medal, nominated (Blown Away)
 2015: Independent Booksellers Book Award, shortlisted (Blown Away)
 2016: Kate Greenaway Medal, nominated (GRRRRR!)
 2016: Independent Booksellers Book Award, shortlisted (GRRRRR!)
 2017: UKLA Student Shadower's Book Award, winner (Odd Dog Out)
 2017: BSC Festival of Literature Picture Book Award, winner (Odd Dog Out)
 2017: Oscar's Book Prize, shortlisted (Odd Dog Out)
 2017: Independent Booksellers Book Award, shortlisted (Odd Dog Out)
 2017: Sheffield Children's Book Award, shortlisted (Odd Dog Out)
 2018: Kate Greenaway Medal, nominated (Sunk!)
 2018: Oscar's Book Prize, shortlisted (Sunk!)
 2018: The People's Book Prize, shortlisted (Sunk!)
 2018: Kate Greenaway Medal, nominated (Kevin)
 2018: BSC Festival of Literature Picture Book Award, shortlisted (Kevin)
 2018: Independent Booksellers Book Award, shortlisted (Kevin)
 2018: Junior Magazine Design Awards, Gold, winner (Dinosaur Juniors: Happy Hatchday)
 2019: Kate Greenaway Medal, nominated (Dinosaur Juniors: Give Peas a Chance)
 2019: BSC Festival of Literature Picture Book Award, shortlisted (Show and Tell)
 2020: UK Point of Light, winner
 2020: Sainsbury's Children's Book Award, winner (Draw With Rob)
 2020: Sheffield Children's Book Award, winner (Show and Tell)
 2021: British Book Awards, shortlisted (Draw With Rob)
 2021: BSC Festival of Literature Picture Book Award, shortlisted (Dog Gone)
 2022: Yoto Carnegie Illustration Medal, nominated (The Blue-footed Booby)

Personal life
Biddulph is married with three daughters, and lives in London. He has a cocker spaniel called Ringo. He is a fan of Arsenal FC.

References

External links
 
 Draw With Rob

Living people
21st-century British novelists
British children's writers
1972 births